Falsettos is a sung-through musical with a book by William Finn and James Lapine, and music and lyrics by Finn. The musical consists of March of the Falsettos (1981) and Falsettoland (1990), the last two installments in a trio of one-act musicals that premiered off-Broadway (the first was In Trousers). The story centers on Marvin, who has left his wife to be with a male lover, Whizzer, and struggles to keep his family together. Much of the first act explores the impact his relationship with Whizzer has had on his family. The second act explores family dynamics that evolve as he and his wife plan his son's bar mitzvah. Central to the musical are the themes of Jewish identity, gender roles, and gay life in the late 1970s and early 1980s. It also deals with the topic of the AIDS epidemic.

Falsettos premiered on Broadway in 1992 and was nominated for seven Tony Awards, winning those for Best Book and Best Original Score. The musical was revived on Broadway in 2016 starring Christian Borle and Andrew Rannells. The 2016 revival was filmed and adapted for the PBS Live from Lincoln Center television series, and aired on October 27, 2017. The revival was nominated for five Tony Awards, including Best Revival of a Musical. Both the original cast and 2016 revival cast performed at the Tony Awards. Other revivals include tours in Australia and the United Kingdom. The musical was praised by critics for its melodic compositions, humor, character development, and positive portrayal of non-traditional family structures.

Background

Inception

Composer William Finn began his theater career with a one-act musical In Trousers (1979), which centers on the character Marvin questioning his sexuality. It was produced twice at Playwrights Horizons off-Broadway, opening in February 1978 and again in December 1979. It was also produced off-Broadway at Second Stage Theater in March 1981. After In Trousers received sharply unfavorable reviews, Finn considered abandoning musical theater and attending medical school. He felt that "if the critic for the Times at that time had been more responsible, it would have been a considerable debut. But as it was, he just said it was junk." Finn struggled in his science classes and discarded his medical school plans, turning back to writing about the character of Marvin.

Finn soon wrote the songs for another one-act musical about Marvin and his family, March of the Falsettos, collaborating with director James Lapine on the book. This premiered at Playwrights Horizons in April 1981, ran there through September and moved to the Westside Theatre in October 1981. March of the Falsettos received more positive critical reception than In Trousers: Ellen Pall of The New York Times wrote that Finn's "brilliant form combined with the absolute topicality of his social themes first bowled critics over". In 1989, Finn premiered another musical, Romance in Hard Times, which did not feature any of the characters of Falsettos; it was not a success.

Almost a decade after March of the Falsettos, in the wake of the 1980s AIDS epidemic, Finn followed with Falsettoland. The musical concluded Finn's "Marvin Trilogy" of one-act pieces about Marvin and his circle, beginning with In Trousers and March of the Falsettos. Falsettoland opened at Playwrights Horizons on June 28, 1990, then moved to the Lucille Lortel Theatre, on September 16, 1990, where it closed on January 27, 1991. It won the 1991 Lucille Lortel Award for Outstanding Musical and the 1991 Drama Desk Award for Outstanding Lyrics.

Composition
Finn and Lapine then combined March of the Falsettos and Falsettoland to form a full-length show, titled Falsettos, slightly altering them to form a "more unified, more thematically consistent" musical. In writing both acts of Falsettos, Finn prioritized making the audience laugh, believing that provoking laughter is more challenging than garnering tears. Each musical was developed during rehearsals, particularly as Finn is a disorganized writer and composer. Finn often composed songs without a clear idea of where they would fit in the musical; he struggled to decide where to place the bar mitzvah in the action. The idea to set it in the hospital came to him in a dream. According to Stephen Bogardus, who played Whizzer in the original cast of both shows as well as in Falsettos, Lapine came up with the idea to incorporate racquetball scenes in Falsettoland, and he and his racquetball partner, Bogardus, added racquetball terminology into the dialogue. The haftorah read by Jason at his bar mitzvah was originally the same one read at Finn's own bar mitzvah, but he "got bored in the middle of writing it" and added words that he enjoyed musically but are grammatically incorrect in Hebrew. Some songs, including "Four Jews in a Room Bitching", originated with Finn humming improvised melodies while strolling the streets of New York City.

Synopsis

Act I: March of the Falsettos

In 1979 in New York City, Marvin, his ten-year-old son Jason, his psychiatrist Mendel, and his boyfriend Whizzer are in the midst of an argument ("Four Jews In a Room Bitching"). Marvin steps forward to explain his situation: He has left his wife Trina for his male lover, Whizzer, but no one is happy with his attempts to integrate Whizzer into the family ("A Tight-Knit Family"). At Marvin's suggestion, Trina visits Mendel and explains she is having trouble accepting the end of her marriage and her failure to be a perfect wife. Mendel, instantly attracted to her, tries to reassure her that she is not to blame ("Love Is Blind"). Marvin and Whizzer note that they have very little in common but are intensely attracted to each other and worry that their feelings for one another are fading ("The Thrill of First Love"). Whizzer presents an interlude titled "Marvin at the Psychiatrist, a Three-Part Mini-Opera". In a series of therapy sessions with Mendel, Marvin discusses his relationship with Whizzer, his failed relationship with Trina (which leads to Mendel pressing him for intimate details about his ex-wife), and his inability to connect with his son. Jason is very worried that because of Marvin's sexuality, he will turn out to be gay too ("'My Father's a Homo'"), and his parents suggest he receive therapy from Mendel to calm his mood swings. Jason refuses to listen to his parents, but agrees to go to therapy once Whizzer adds his recommendation ("Everyone Tells Jason to See a Psychiatrist").

Marvin and Whizzer fight over Whizzer's lack of enthusiasm for monogamy and Marvin's attempt to force him into the role of a housewife ("This Had Better Come to a Stop"), while Trina is concerned that Whizzer is taking her place in the family and has a mental breakdown ("I'm Breaking Down"). Trina requests that Mendel provide in-home therapy for Jason ("Please Come to Our House"), and after getting to know her and Jason through these sessions, Mendel clumsily proposes to her. Trina accepts, sparking jealousy in Marvin ("A Marriage Proposal"). Trina is frustrated with the male-dominated world she lives in and the immaturity of the four men around her, who sing a hymn to masculinity,  the three adults singing in falsetto to match Jason's unbroken voice ("Trina's Song/March of the Falsettos").
Trina recollects herself and calms down from her frustration (Trina's Song - Reprise).

Marvin tries to teach Whizzer how to play chess, but bitterness and ill-feeling boil over ("The Chess Game"). They fight and break up. Meanwhile, Trina and Mendel move in together ("Making a Home"). As he packs, Whizzer reflects on his life and relationship with Marvin. He has  been used and abused by other men because of his looks his whole life, and Whizzer finally decides that he doesn't want to live like that anymore. ("The Games I Play"). After receiving Mendel and Trina's marriage announcement, Marvin breaks down in rage and slaps her ("Marvin Hits Trina"). Shocked by his actions, everyone confesses that they never intended to feel so deeply about the people in their lives, and they accept the pain that love can bring ("I Never Wanted To Love You"). Jason discovers his attraction to girls, to his immense relief. In the wake of the destruction of his relationships with both Whizzer and Trina, Marvin sits Jason down for a talk and tells him that no matter what kind of man Jason turns out to be, Marvin will always be there for him ("Father to Son") .

Act II: Falsettoland

It is 1981, two years later. Nancy Reagan is in the White House, and two new people are introduced: Marvin's lesbian neighbors Dr. Charlotte, an internist, and Cordelia, a non-Jewish caterer specializing in Jewish cuisine. Marvin observes that it's "About Time" to grow up and get over himself. He has managed to maintain his relationship with Jason and now shares split custody with Trina, who has married Mendel. He has not seen Whizzer for two years and has not gotten over him (Falsettoland/About Time). Marvin and Trina begin planning "Jason's Bar Mitzvah", and each character has a different opinion regarding how it should be celebrated ("The Year of the Child"). Later, at Jason's Little League Baseball game, Jason ponders which girls he will invite to the bar mitzvah ("The Miracle of Judaism"). Whizzer arrives at the baseball game after being invited by Jason. Marvin cautiously asks Whizzer on a date just as Jason manages to hit the ball ("The Baseball Game"). An interlude ends with everyone reflecting on how wonderful life is ("A Day in Falsettoland"). Soon afterwards, Marvin and Trina argue at length about the logistics of the bar mitzvah ("The Fight"), which makes Jason want to call it off. Mendel consoles the boy, telling him that "Everyone Hates His Parents" at his age, but everyone eventually matures and hates them less.

Marvin sits in bed one morning, looking at the sleeping Whizzer, and wonders at how much he loves him ("What More Can I Say?"). Dr. Charlotte, meanwhile, is becoming aware that young gay men in the city arrive at the hospital sick with a mysterious illness that no one understands ("Something Bad is Happening"). Whizzer collapses suddenly during a game of racquetball and is hospitalized, and Trina is disturbed to find how upset she is at his condition ("Holding to the Ground"). In Whizzer's hospital room, everyone gathers to cheer him up, commenting on how well he looks. They agree that it is days like this that make these secular Jews believe in God, but Jason, in childish honesty, tells Whizzer that he looks awful ("Days Like This"). Mendel and Trina sit Jason down to inform him that Whizzer may not recover; they give him the option of "Canceling the Bar Mitzvah". Marvin sits in Whizzer's hospital room, soon joined by Cordelia and Dr. Charlotte, and the four "Unlikely Lovers" reaffirm their commitment to each other despite Whizzer's worsening situation.

As Whizzer's condition deteriorates, Jason turns to God, offering to get bar mitzvahed if Whizzer gets better ("Another Miracle of Judaism"). Dr. Charlotte explains to Marvin that "Something Bad is Happening" and heavily implies that Marvin may become sick as well. Whizzer's illness becomes terminal, and he resolves to face death with dignity and courage ("You Gotta Die Sometime"). Suddenly, everyone bursts into the hospital room. Jason has had an epiphany: he wants to hold the ceremony in Whizzer's hospital room ("Jason's Bar Mitzvah"). As Jason completes his recitation, Whizzer collapses and is taken from the room, followed by all but Marvin. Marvin, left alone, asks the departed Whizzer what his life would be if they had not loved each other. Whizzer's spirit appears, and asks if Marvin regrets their relationship, and Marvin resolutely states he would do it again ("What Would I Do?"). Marvin's friends and family surround him, and he finally loses his composure and breaks down in their arms. Mendel steps forward, tearfully declaring that "this is where we take a stand" ("Falsettoland (reprise)").

Song list

Act One 
 "Four Jews in a Room Bitching" – Whizzer, Marvin, Jason, Mendel, and Trina
 "A Tight-Knit Family" – Marvin
 "Love Is Blind" – Marvin, Jason, Whizzer, Mendel, and Trina
 "Thrill of First Love" – Marvin and Whizzer
 "Marvin at the Psychiatrist" – Mendel, Marvin, Jason, and Whizzer
 "My Father's a Homo" – Jason
 "Everyone Tells Jason to See a Psychiatrist" – Jason, Marvin, Trina, and Whizzer
 "This Had Better Come to a Stop" – Marvin, Whizzer, Jason, Trina, and Mendel
 "I'm Breaking Down" – Trina (Added for the Broadway run; written originally for In Trousers)
 "Please Come to Our House" – Mendel, Trina, and Jason.
 "Jason's Therapy" – Mendel, Trina, Whizzer, Marvin, and Jason
 "A Marriage Proposal" – Mendel, Trina, and Jason
 "A Tight-Knit Family (reprise)" – Mendel and Marvin
 "Trina's Song" – Trina
 "March of the Falsettos" – Mendel, Marvin, Jason, and Whizzer
 "Trina's Song" (reprise) – Trina
 "The Chess Game" – Marvin and Whizzer
 "Making a Home" – Mendel, Jason, Trina, and Whizzer
 "The Games I Play" – Whizzer
 "Marvin Hits Trina" – Marvin, Mendel, Jason, Trina, and Whizzer
 "I Never Wanted to Love You" – Marvin, Mendel, Jason, Trina, and Whizzer
 "Father to Son" – Marvin and Jason

Act Two
 "Falsettoland" – Company
 "About Time" – Company
 "The Year of the Child" – Marvin, Trina, Mendel, Jason, Charlotte, and Cordelia
 "Miracle of Judaism" – Jason
 "The Baseball Game" – Company 
 "A Day in Falsettoland" – Trina, Mendel, Charlotte, Cordelia, Diane, and Whizzer
 "The Fight" – Mendel, Jason, Marvin, and Trina
 "Everyone Hates His Parents" – Mendel, Jason, Marvin, and Trina
 "What More Can I Say" – Marvin
 "Something Bad Is Happening" – Charlotte and Cordelia
 "More Racquetball" – Marvin and Whizzer
 "Holding to the Ground" – Trina
 "Days Like This" – The Company
 "Cancelling the Bar Mitzvah" – Mendel, Trina, and Jason
 "Unlikely Lovers" – Marvin, Whizzer, Charlotte, and Cordelia
 "Another Miracle of Judaism" – Jason
 "Something Bad Is Happening (reprise)" – Charlotte
 "You Gotta Die Sometime" – Whizzer
 "Jason's Bar Mitzvah" – The Company
 "What Would I Do?" – Marvin, Whizzer
 "Falsettoland (Reprise) – MendelEncore
 "In Trousers" – Marvin and Ladies

Productions

Original Broadway production

Falsettos opened on Broadway at the John Golden Theatre on April 29, 1992, and closed on June 27, 1993, after 487 performances. Directed by James Lapine, the cast included Michael Rupert as Marvin, Stephen Bogardus as Whizzer, Barbara Walsh as Trina, Chip Zien as Mendel (he played Marvin in In Trousers), Jonathan Kaplan as Jason, Heather MacRae as Charlotte, and Carolee Carmello as Cordelia. Rupert, Bogardus, and Zien reprised their roles from the original off-Broadway productions of March of the Falsettos and Falsettoland, MacRae reprised her role from Falsettoland, and Walsh reprised her role from a Hartford Stage regional production of Falsettoland. Scenic design was by Douglas Stein, costumes by Ann Hould-Ward, and lighting by Frances Aronson. The cast and producers were unsure if the show would find a strong following on Broadway, but were encouraged when Frank Rich of The New York Times gave the musical a positive review.

Falsettos, the last show of Broadway's 1991–92 season, had a budget of $957,000, a low budget by Broadway standards. Producers Barry and Fran Weissler tried various marketing strategies to promote the musical. Hoping to create an easily-identifiable logo inspired by the minimalist design of Cats, the Weisslers used the work of artist Keith Haring in which two adults and a child hold up a bright red heart. Although audiences were enthusiastic at previews, the producers worried that the marketing strategy would not draw a large audience, and Barry Weissler explained that "Since Keith died of AIDS, many people felt the drawing was meant to attract a gay audience." The Weisslers then hired advertising agency LeDonne, Wilner & Weiner, who launched a promotional campaign centered on photographing audience members "not targeting specific Catholic or Jewish or family audiences, but trying to get across the idea that Falsettos is for everyone." The advertisers invited the newly-crowned Miss America, who had recently launched an Atlantic City-based AIDS awareness campaign, to attend the show and be photographed. In the following months, the producers began to earn back their initial investment and to profit from the show.

Australian productions 
In 1994, Sydney Theatre Company presented an Australian production directed by Wayne Harrison and featuring John O'May as Marvin, Gina Riley as Trina, Tony Sheldon as Mendel, and Simon Burke as Whizzer. After playing at the Sydney Opera House's Drama Theatre from 12 January to 5 March 1994, the production toured Victoria, Hobart and Canberra. Riley and Sheldon were both awarded Green Room Awards for this production, winning Best Female Artist in a Leading Role and Best for Best Male Artist in a Supporting Role, respectively.

In 2014 Darlinghurst Theatre Company presented a revival directed by Stephen Colyer. The cast featured Tamlyn Henderson as Marvin, Katrina Retallick as Trina, Stephen Anderson as Mendel, Ben Hall as Whizzer, Elise McCann as Cordelia and Margi de Ferranti as Charlotte. The production played as part of the Sydney Mardi Gras festival throughout February and March 2014. In her review of the production, Cassie Tongue of Aussie Theatre viewed the production as a "promising sign of things to come" for the Sydney theater scene, and praised the casting by remarking, "Henderson's Marvin and Retallick's Trina are clear standouts, and de Ferranti and McCann are so essential to the emotional weight of the second act that they are just as impressive as if they had been there from the first".

2016 Broadway revival

Producer Jordan Roth announced in 2015 that he would revive the show under the direction of James Lapine in the spring of 2016. The set design incorporated a cube made of large blocks that the characters rearranged throughout the show. The production began previews on Broadway at the Walter Kerr Theatre on September 29, 2016, and opened officially on October 27, directed by Lapine. Christian Borle, Andrew Rannells, Stephanie J. Block and Brandon Uranowitz played Marvin, Whizzer, Trina, and Mendel respectively. Tracie Thoms was Dr. Charlotte, Betsy Wolfe played Cordelia, and Anthony Rosenthal was Jason.

The production closed on January 8, 2017. Two performances were filmed on January 3 and 4, 2017, which were repackaged into a presentation for the PBS television series Live from Lincoln Center, and aired on October 27, 2017. A North American tour of the 2016 Broadway revival launched in February 2019, under Lapine's direction, and ended in late June 2019. Max von Essen starred as Marvin, with Eden Espinosa as Trina, Nick Adams as Whizzer, and Nick Blaemire as Mendel.

2019 Off-West End 
Selladoor Worldwide announced that they would produce Falsettos at The Other Palace, an off-West End theatre in London, for a strictly limited run. The show began previews on August 30, 2019, before officially opening on September 5. The original cast featured Natasha J Barnes as Cordelia, Daniel Boys as Marvin, Gemma Knight-Jones as Charlotte, Laura Pitt-Pulford as Trina, and Oliver Savile as Whizzer. Joel Montague played Mendel. The show closed on November 23, 2019.

Before the production opened, a group of more than 20 Jewish actors and playwrights, including Miriam Margolyes and Maureen Lipman, signed an open letter to the producers, concerned about the lack of Jewish presence within the cast and creatives. Despite this, the show opened to mostly positive reviews, with critics praising the cast, story and music, but aiming criticism at the set design. The show was nominated for Best Video Design and won Best Off-West End Production at the 2020 WhatsOnStage Awards.

Themes

Judaism

Jewish culture and identity plays a significant role in Falsettos. It takes place in the "often humorous environment of Jewish neuroses and self-deprecation". Finn gave Judaism a central role in the musical, emphasized by beginning it with the song "Four Jews in a Room Bitching". The stage version begins with all four male characters dressed in clothing from Biblical times before they remove these robes to reveal modern clothing. In the song, three characters state that they are Jewish, while Whizzer specifies that he is "half-Jewish". The first act, "March of the Falsettos", was originally intended to be titled Four Jews in a Room Bitching until Lapine insisted that Finn change the title. Writers Raymond and Zelda Knapp compared the implications of the AIDS epidemic in Falsettos to the foreshadowing of the Holocaust in the 1964 Jewish musical Fiddler on the Roof, noting that both works suggest the "comparatively innocent" atmosphere before tragedy and the "grim" environment afterward.

Jason's bar mitzvah is a major plot point and accentuates the theme of the male characters maturing and becoming men. Jesse Oxfeld of The Forward wrote that the musical is a "story about love and family – about making your own chosen family, which is of course a classic gay trope, but also, in its message of accommodation and dedication and, well, l'dor v'dor, very Jewish." He also noted that due to the musical's casual, matter-of-fact depiction of homosexuality, "The lesbians are most interesting for being goyim". The song "The Baseball Game" pokes fun at a stereotypical lack of athletic prowess among American Jews, but Mendel then points out the success of Jewish baseball players Sandy Koufax and Hank Greenberg. Finn, who played Little League baseball as a child, invited Koufax to a performance of Falsettos in Los Angeles, and the baseball player was "offended – not at all pleased" by the joke.

AIDS epidemic
While Falsettos never explicitly mentions the words HIV or AIDS, the disease plays a major role in the second half of the musical. Whizzer first hand suffers from the disease and ultimately loses his life to it. Examples of implicit references to the virus include "Something that kills/Something infectious/Something that spreads from one man to another" and "something so bad that words have lost their meaning". The first half of the musical takes place in 1979, before the start of the epidemic, and the second half takes place in 1981, the year the epidemic began. This historical development results in the first act being primarily a comedy, but the second being mostly a tragedy, so that an audience member is likely to "enter laughing and exit crying". In 1981, the disease was not understood by the medical community and was eventually called GRID (Gay-related immune deficiency) by The New York Times in May 1982. Lapine has described the AIDS epidemic as "a time frame in our past that has somewhat been forgotten ... we had lost a lot of people to HIV. ... We really need to keep that history alive.'"

Finn wanted to convey the tragedy of AIDS accurately in Falsettoland and thought, "I can't have AIDS be peripheral in the show, and I don't know that I could write about AIDS head-on because the horror is too real and I don't want to trivialize it." Finn later described Falsettos as a "catharsis for people who've been going through the AIDS epidemic as well as for people not going through it", hoping that the show would allow people who had only read about the epidemic to empathize with people who had lived through it first-hand. The inclusion of lesbian characters Charlotte and Cordelia is a tribute to the lesbians who assisted gay men during the epidemic. Finn expressed that the inclusion of women in the story was paramount to the message of the show, explaining, "Gay men's lives have a lot of women in them. This is important to come into the conversation. They should not be ignored." The show also explores heterosexual Trina's perspective on Whizzer's illness in "Holding to the Ground", where she shows solidarity with him despite previously struggling to accept his relationship with Marvin.

The revival of the show in 2016 was partly intended to educate young LGBT youth about gay life in the 1980s and to instill a sense of gratitude at how both societal views of gay people and HIV/AIDS treatments have vastly improved since that period. Lapine was inspired to revisit the show when attending a performance of The Normal Heart with a recent college graduate. He recalled: "At intermission, she just looked at me and she said, 'Well, I kind of know about AIDS, but was it really like this?'" AIDS activist and playwright of The Normal Heart Larry Kramer attended a performance of the 2016 Falsettos revival. Andrew Rannells, who portrayed Whizzer, noted that seeing Kramer in the audience while singing "You Gotta Die Sometime" left him "completely wrecked" due to his admiration for Kramer's activism in support of the LGBT community and HIV-positive people.

Masculinity
Charles Isherwood of The New York Times asserts that definitions of masculinity form "a sharp undercurrent in the show". In the first act, Marvin attempts to force Whizzer into the role of "pretty boy homemaker", which causes Whizzer to step away from the relationship. Though Marvin is now in a same-sex relationship, he still tries to assume the more traditionally masculine role of the provider. Daily Herald writer Jennifer Farrar characterized the arguments between Marvin and Whizzer as "testosterone-laden". The song "March of the Falsettos" is an ode to the immaturity of the male characters, and features the three adult male characters singing in falsetto to match Jason's pre-pubescent voice. In "Trina's Song", Trina complains that "I'm tired of all the happy men who rule the world", and "her fondness for the man-babies in her life battling with exasperation and needy resentment at every turn."

Trina's struggles with the men in her life are also symbolized in "I'm Breaking Down", where she manically chops bananas and carrots for her "banana-carrot surprise", "an unusual combination but an appropriately phallic one". By including Jason's bar mitzvah as a key component of the second act, Finn represents the evolution of the male characters in the show. Finn explains, "There's so much about what it means to be a man in the show. It's not only the kid becoming a man – it's kind of all the men becoming men. It's a metaphor that resonates." Critics interpreted the set design of the 2016 revival to reflect immaturity by representing the New York City skyline in the form of children's building blocks. The musical additionally explores the link between masculinity and sexuality. Marvin's preteen son Jason questions his sexuality and worries that his father's homosexuality could be genetically passed down to him "My Father's a Homo".

Reception

Early performances
Frank Rich of The New York Times praised the 1992 opening night performance as "exhilarating and heartbreaking", speaking favorably of the musical's cast, humor, and emotional depth. He called Jason's bar mitzvah scene "one of the most moving you've ever seen" and explained that in addressing the AIDS epidemic, "It is the heaven-sent gift of Mr. Finn and company that they make you believe that the love, no less fortissimo, somehow lingers on." Joe Brown of The Washington Post praised the chemistry between Marvin and Whizzer, calling their relationship "sexily combative". Brown also highlighted the emotional ending, stating that the audience, "which began the play roaring with laughter, is left in tear-soaked shreds". Jeremy Gerard of Variety commented that "to call Falsettos a musical about gay life in modern times is also to shortchange its tremendous appeal as a masterly feat of comic storytelling and as a visionary musical theater work". Gerard thought "Four Jews in a Room Bitching" "hilarious" and praised the musical's pacing, opining that "Lapine and Finn tell their complex story with astonishing economy".

In her report about Finn's Tony Award acceptance speech in June 1992, Kim Hubbard of People characterized Falsettos as both "a laugh-a-minute musical" and "a tragedy filled with hope". Sylvie Drake of the Los Angeles Times called a 1993 San Diego performance a "stunning ode to modern living" noting that the musical's "virtuosity is in its mastery of the bittersweet – and eventually the tragic – wailing over life's nasty habit of giving and taking away, but without wasting time on self-pity. Instead, the show makes intricate songs from the sour lemons. And the result is glorious lemonade." In 2016, Daily Herald writer Jennifer Farrar wrote that the play was considered "groundbreaking for its time" upon its 1992 debut.

John Simon of New York magazine, however, lamented the musical's "big lie" of portraying the illness of AIDS to look "gentle, elegant–something like a nineteenth-century heroine's wistful expiring of consumption–where we all know that it is grueling and gruesome". Clive Barnes of the New York Post wrote that the musical "clatters like a set of false teeth in a politically correct ventriloquist's dummy". Douglas Watt of the New York Daily News described the musical as "too sweet and sugary by far" and its plot as "sticky with sentiment", comparing the tone of Falsettos to that of a soap opera. In his book The Complete Book of 1990s Broadway Musicals, Dan Dietz called the musical "commendable … but weak and disappointing in execution" and described the characters as "too bright, too self-aware, too articulate, and too 'on". He further commented that "one never had time to get to gradually know and discover [the characters] because they were forever explaining themselves."

2016 revival
Reviewing the 2016 revival, Alexis Soloski of The Guardian called the show "radically intimate" and praised the musical's emotional depth and character development, remarking that, "anyone who leaves without shedding a tear may want to see his or her ophthalmologist". She viewed the first half as more complex than the second, which she described as "more conventional, its narrative arc familiar, its characterizations less intense, particularly those of the lesbians". Jesse Green of Vulture.com described the ending as "almost unbearably moving". Chris Jones of the Chicago Tribune wrote that Falsettos "throbs with passion and compassion, a masterwork strong enough to bare  formative comparison to the work of Stephen Sondheim, but a whole lot more cuddly of a show". He praised the performances of Block, Thoms, and Wolfe, writing, "The show centers on men in its structure, but the women in this cast all are so strong that you sense a realignment from 25 years ago." Emily Bruno of Broadway World wrote, "Groundbreaking...achingly poignant."

Linda Winer of Newsweek appreciated Finn's "enormously quotable, conversational lyrics that catch in the throat as often as they stick in the mind", describing "Unlikely Lovers" as an "emotional killer of an anthem". Winer also commented on the show's set design, noting, "though David Rockwell's modular foam set pieces and silhouetted Manhattan skyline can get a bit monotonous, they support the passion by getting out of the play's powerful way". Marilyn Stasio of Variety called the cast "terrific". She characterized the music as "a fusion of tuneful melodies with insightful lyrics". Christopher Kelly of NJ.com praised Rannells and Block, stating that the latter's performance of "I'm Breaking Down" "sends the show to such dizzying heights that it takes the audience a few minutes to recover". However, he felt that Borle "comes across as too staid – it  impossible to see what Whizzer sees in the guy." Melissa Rose Bernardo of Entertainment Weekly gave the show a "B+" and noted the musical's emotional impact, exclaiming, "Curse you, William Finn, for writing these heart-wrenching songs. And curse me for forgetting the Kleenex." She described "The Baseball Game" as "a work of lyrical comic genius".

Recordings
The original cast recordings of the Off-Broadway The March of the Falsettos and Falsettoland were both released by DRG Records on January 1, 1991.

The Broadway revival cast album was released on January 27, 2017. This album peaked at number two on the Billboard Cast Albums chart and number 98 on the Billboard Album Sales chart. PBS aired a filmed performance of the revival as part of Live from Lincoln Center on October 27, 2017. For this recording, lines in "I'm Breaking Down," "The Chess Game," "The Baseball Game," "You Gotta Die Sometime," and "A Day in Falsettoland" were edited for profanity.

Notable casts 

 Replacements/Transfers (Original Broadway Cast)
 Marvin – Mandy Patinkin, Gregg Edelman, Adrian Zmed
 Trina – Randy Graff 
 Mendel – Jason Graae
 Cordelia – Maureen Moore
 Jason - Anthony Roth Costanzo

Awards and accolades
Falsettos won Best Original Score and Best Book of a Musical at the 1992 Tony Awards. The 2016 revival was nominated for five Tony Awards, including Best Revival of a Musical. The 2016 revival cast performed "A Day in Falsettoland" at the 71st Tony Awards.

Original Broadway production

2016 Broadway revival

2019 Off-West End

References

Bibliography
Dietz, Dan. "The Complete Book of 1990s Broadway Musicals". Lanham, Maryland: Rowman & Littlefield Publishers, 2016. 
Miller, Scott. "You Could Drive a Person Crazy: Chronicle of an American Theatre Company". Bloomington, Ind: iUniverse Publishers, 2002. 
Sternfeld, Jessica. "The Routledge Companion to the Contemporary Musical". Abingdon-on-Thames, England: Routledge, 2019.

External links
 

1992 musicals
Broadway musicals
HIV/AIDS in theatre
LGBT-related musicals
Musicals by James Lapine
Musicals by William Finn
Plays set in New York City
Plays set in the 1970s
Plays set in the 1980s
Sung-through musicals
Tony Award-winning musicals
Plays about Jews and Judaism